Íñigo Calderón Zapatería (born 4 January 1982) is a Spanish former professional footballer who played as a right-back, currently assistant manager of Deportivo Alavés B.

He played for Alicante and Alavés in Spain, joining Brighton & Hove Albion in 2010 and going on to remain several years with the club while appearing in 232 competitive games.

Club career

Spain
Born in Vitoria-Gasteiz, Álava, Basque Country, Calderón started his professional career with Alicante CF in the Segunda División B, achieving two first-place finishes and one third during his three-year spell but seeing his team consecutively fail in the promotion play-offs.

In 2007, he moved to Deportivo Alavés (he had already represented its C and B sides early in his career), playing two Segunda División seasons – often serving as team captain– and suffering relegation in his second year.

Brighton & Hove Albion
On 7 January 2010, after a spell on trial, Calderón signed with Football League One club Brighton & Hove Albion on a contract until the end of the season. He made his debut nine days later in a 2–1 win at Walsall, and scored his first goal for the Seagulls in another away fixture (also 2–1 victory), against Charlton Athletic on 23 February.

Calderón's offer of a new contract at Brighton was withdrawn after he agreed to join League One rivals Southampton in May 2010. However, on 10 June, the player agreed to a new three-year deal, with manager Gus Poyet claiming "Calde is a quality player and was always our first-choice right-back...".

In the 2010–11 season, Calderón scored eight goals, including a first-half strike in the 4–3 victory over Dagenham & Redbridge that helped Albion secure promotion to the Championship. He subsequently signed a one-year extension, keeping him at the Falmer Stadium until 2014.

Calderón netted his first goal of 2011–12 in the 2–0 home defeat of Bristol City – a thunderous drive from 25 yards. He appeared predominantly as a right midfielder in 2014–15, scoring four times and being subsequently voted player of the season.

Later years
On 9 July 2016, aged 34, free agent Calderón joined Cypriot First Division club Anorthosis Famagusta F.C. on a one-year contract. On 19 July 2017, he switched to the Indian Super League with Chennaiyin FC.

Calderon returned to Alavés immediately after retiring, as assistant coach to the reserves.

Personal life
Calderón has a master's degree in sport psychology. He is also a qualified teacher.

Career statistics

Club

Honours
Brighton & Hove Albion
Football League One: 2010–11

Chennaiyin
Indian Super League: 2017–18

Individual
PFA Team of the Year: 2010–11 League One
Indian Super League Fittest Player: 2017–18

References

External links

Official Brighton & Hove Albion profile

1982 births
Living people
Spanish footballers
Footballers from Vitoria-Gasteiz
Association football defenders
Segunda División players
Segunda División B players
Deportivo Alavés B players
Alicante CF footballers
Deportivo Alavés players
English Football League players
Brighton & Hove Albion F.C. players
Cypriot First Division players
Anorthosis Famagusta F.C. players
Indian Super League players
Chennaiyin FC players
Spanish expatriate footballers
Expatriate footballers in England
Expatriate footballers in Cyprus
Expatriate footballers in India
Spanish expatriate sportspeople in England
Spanish expatriate sportspeople in Cyprus
Spanish expatriate sportspeople in India